Peavy Arboretum (40 acres) is an arboretum operated by Oregon State University and located on Arboretum Road, Corvallis, Oregon. It is open to the public daily without charge.

The arboretum was dedicated by the university in 1926, operated as a Civilian Conservation Corps (CCC) camp from 1933–1942, and reverted to College of Forestry management in 1964. While the CCC was active, they planted trees, expanded the nursery, constructed Cronemiller Lake, and built roads, trails, and firebreaks.

Plants
Today the arboretum includes a variety of native and exotic woody plants, including:
Abies alba
Abies bracteata
Abies cephalonica
Abies cilicica
Abies concolor
Abies grandis
Abies lasiocarpa
Abies magnifica
Abies magnifica var. shastensis
Abies pinsapo
Abies procera
Acer grosseri
Acer macrophyllum
Acer platanoides
Acer saccharum
Aesculus sp.
Alnus incana
Alnus japonica
Alnus rhombifolia
Alnus rubra
Amelanchier alnofolia
Arbutus menziesii
Arctostaphylos patula
Baccharis piluaris
Berberis aquifolium
Berberis nervosa
Betula occidentalis
Betula pendula
Calocedrus decurrens
Carpinus caroliniana
Castanea dentate
Cercidiphyllum japonicum
Cedrus deodara
Cedrus libani
Cercocarpus betutoides
Cercocarpus montanus
Chamaecyparis lawsoniana
Chamaecyparis nootkatensis
Chamaecyparis obtuse
Comas nuttalii
Cornus florida
Cornus stolonifera var. occidentalis
Corylus avellana
Corylus colurna
Corylus cornuta
Crataegus douglasii
Cupressus arizonica
Cupressus bakeri
Cupressus macnabiana
Cupressus macrocarpa
Cupressus sargentiana
Cupressus sempervirens
Cupressus sp.
Forsythia sp.
Fraxinus latifolia
Garrya elliptica
Gaultheria shallon
Holodiscus discolor
Hypericum sp.
Ilex aquifolium
Juglans nigra
Juniperus occidentails
Juniperus rigida
Juniperus sp.
Juniperus virginiana
Larix dahurica
Larix occidentalis
Larix sp.
Ligustrum sp.
Lonicera sp.
Malus sp.
Metasequoia glyptostroboides
Myrica californica
Myrica pensylvanica
Oemleria cerasiformis
Ostrya carpinifolia
Physocarpus capitatus
Picea engelmannii
Picea glauca
Picea pungens
Picea sitchensis
Pinus aristata
Pinus attenu radiate
Pinus attenuate
Pinus backsiana
Pinus contorta
Pinus contorta var. latifolia
Pinus coulteri
Pinus densiflora
Pinus enchinata
Pinus jeffreyi
Pinus jeffreyi var. coulteri
Pinus monticola
Pinus muricata
Pinus nigra
Pinus peuce
Pinus pinaster
Pinus ponderosa
Pinus resinosa
Pinus sabiniana

Pinus sp.
Pinus strobes
Pinus sylvestris
Pinus thunbergii
Populus alba
Populus deltoids
Populus trichocarpa
Prunus Americana
Prunus emarginata
Prunus serotina
Prunus sp.
Prunus virginiana
Pseudotsuga menziesii
Pseudotsuga menziesii var. glauca
Pyrus communis
Pyrus fusca
Pyrus malus
Quercus chrysolepis
Quercus garryana
Quercus kelloggii
Quercus velutina
Rhamnus purshiana
Rhododendron macrophyllum
Rhododendron sp.
Rhododendron sp.
Rhus diversiloba
Ribes lobbii
Robinia pseudoacaia
Rosa sp.
Rosa woodsii
Rubus discolor
Rubus laciniatus
Rubus parviflorus
Rubus ursinus
Salix sp.
Sambucus cerulean
Sequoia sempervirens
Sequoiadendron giganteum
Sorbus aucuparia
Spiraea douglasii
Styrax japonica
Symphoricarpos albus
Taxus brevifolia
Thuja occidentalis
Thuja plicata
Torreya californica
Tsuga heterophylla
Tsuga mertensiana
Ulmus pumila
Vaccinium ovatum
Vaccinium parvifolium

Specimens are mapped and clearly labeled.

See also 
 List of botanical gardens in the United States

References

External links
Peavy Arboretum

1926 establishments in Oregon
Arboreta in Oregon
Civilian Conservation Corps in Oregon
Oregon State University
Protected areas of Benton County, Oregon
Protected areas established in 1926